Stellar means anything related to one or more stars (stella). The term may also refer to:

Arts, entertainment, and media
 Stellar (magazine), an Irish lifestyle and fashion magazine
 Stellar Loussier, a character from Mobile Suit Gundam SEED Destiny
 Dr. Stellar, a Big Bang Comics superhero
 Stellar 7, a game for the Apple II computer system
 Stellar (film), a Canadian film

Music
 Stellar (group), a South Korean girl group
 Stellar (New Zealand band), a New Zealand-based rock band
 Stellar (musical artist), an American singer, songwriter, and producer
 "Stellar" (song), a 2000 song by Incubus
 Stellar Awards, awards for the gospel music industry

Brands and enterprises
 Stellar (payment network), a system for sending money through the internet
 Stellar Group (construction company), a construction company in Florida, United States
 Hasselblad Stellar, a compact digital camera
 Hyundai Stellar, an automobile model
 O2 XDA Stellar, an HTC mobile phone

Other uses
 Stellar Airpark, an airport near Chandler, Arizona, United States
 Stellar Charter School, a school in Redding, California, United States
 Eliot Stellar (1919–1993), American psychologist

See also
 List of stellar properties, links to astrophysics pages with the word stellar
 
 
 Star or 
 Stella (disambiguation)
 Stellar II (disambiguation)
 Stellaris (disambiguation)